Events from the year 1941 in the United States. At the end of this year, the United States enters World War II by declaring war on the Empire of Japan following the attack on Pearl Harbor.

Incumbents

Federal Government 
 President: Franklin D. Roosevelt (D-New York)
 Vice President: John Nance Garner (D-Texas) (until January 20), Henry A. Wallace (D-Iowa) (starting January 20)
 Chief Justice: Charles Evans Hughes (New York) (until June 30), Harlan F. Stone (New York) (starting July 3)
 Speaker of the House of Representatives: Sam Rayburn (D-Texas)
 Senate Majority Leader: Alben W. Barkley (D-Kentucky)
 Congress: 76th (until January 3), 77th (starting January 3)

Events

January

 January 4 – The short subject Elmer's Pet Rabbit is released, marking the second appearance of Bugs Bunny, and also the first to have his name on a title card.
 January 6
 Four Freedoms speech: During his State of the Union address, President Roosevelt presents his Four Freedoms as fundamental global human rights.
 January 10 – The Lend-Lease law is introduced into the U.S. Congress.
 January 13 – All persons born in Puerto Rico since this day are declared U.S. citizens by birth, through U.S. federal law .
 January 20 – Chief Justice Charles Evans Hughes swears in President Franklin D. Roosevelt for his third term. Henry A. Wallace is sworn in as Vice President of the United States.
 January 23 – Aviator Charles Lindbergh testifies before the U.S. Congress and recommends that the United States negotiate a neutrality pact with Adolf Hitler.
 January 27 – World War II – Attack on Pearl Harbor: U.S. Ambassador to Japan Joseph Grew passes on to Washington, D.C. a rumor overheard at a diplomatic reception about a planned surprise attack upon Pearl Harbor, Hawaii.
 January – The Parker 51 fountain pen is first sold.

February
 February 4 – World War II: The United Service Organization (USO) is created to entertain American troops.
 February 8 – World War II: The U.S. House of Representatives passes the Lend-Lease law.
 February 9 – Winston Churchill, in a worldwide broadcast, asks the United States to show its support by sending arms to the British: "Give us the tools, and we will finish the job."
 February 14 – World War II – Attack on Pearl Harbor: Admiral Kichisaburō Nomura begins his duties as Japanese ambassador to the United States.
 February 27 – The 13th Academy Awards, hosted by Bob Hope, are presented at Biltmore Hotel in Los Angeles, with Alfred Hitchcock's Rebecca winning Outstanding Production. The film also received the most nominations with 11, while The Thief of Baghdad wins the most awards with three. John Ford wins his second Best Director award for The Grapes of Wrath.

March

 March – Captain America Comics #1 issues the first Captain America & Bucky comic.
 March 1 
W47NV begins operations in Nashville, Tennessee, becoming the first fully licensed commercial FM radio station.
Arthur L. Bristol becomes Rear Admiral for the United States Navy's Support Force, Atlantic Fleet.
 March 8 – World War II: The U.S. Senate passes the Lend-Lease  law.
 March 11 – World War II: President Roosevelt signs Lend-Lease into law, providing for the U.S. to give military equipment to the Allies.
 March 17 – National Gallery of Art is officially opened by President Franklin D. Roosevelt.
 March 22 – Washington state's Grand Coulee Dam begins to generate electricity.
 March 27 – World War II – Attack on Pearl Harbor: Japanese spy Takeo Yoshikawa arrives in Honolulu, Hawaii and begins to study the United States fleet at Pearl Harbor.
 March 30 – All German, Italian and Danish ships anchored in United States waters are taken into "protective custody".

April
 April 9 – The U.S. acquires full military defense rights in Greenland.
 April 10 – World War II:  The U.S. destroyer Niblack, while picking up survivors from a sunken Dutch freighter, drops depth charges on a German U-boat (the first "shot in anger" fired by America against Germany).
 April 15 – World War II:  The U.S. begins shipping Lend-Lease military equipment to China.
 April 23 – The America First Committee holds its first mass rally in New York City, with Charles Lindbergh as keynote speaker.
 April 25 – Franklin D. Roosevelt, at his regular press conference, criticizes Charles Lindbergh by comparing him to the Copperheads of the Civil War period.  In response, Lindbergh resigns his commission in the U.S. Army Air Corps Reserve on April 28.

May

 May – Woody Guthrie records the Columbia River Ballads.
 May 1 
Orson Welles' film Citizen Kane premieres in New York City.
The first Series E "War Bonds" and Defense Savings Stamps go on sale in the United States, to help fund the greatly increased production of military equipment.
 May 6 – At California's March Field, entertainer Bob Hope performs his first USO Show.
 May 15 – Joe DiMaggio's 56-game hitting streak begins as the New York Yankee center fielder goes one for 4 against Chicago White Sox pitcher Eddie Smith.
 May 21 – World War II: 950 miles off the coast of Brazil, the freighter  becomes the first United States (neutral) ship sunk by a German U-boat, after its crew have been allowed to disembark.
 May 27 – World War II: President Roosevelt proclaims an "unlimited national emergency."

June
 June 14 – All German and Italian assets in the United States are frozen.
 June 16
 All German and Italian consulates in the United States are ordered closed and their staffs to leave the country by July 10.
 Official start of production at Ford's Willow Run facility (Air Force Plant 31) in Michigan. At its wartime peak, it will produce one B-24 bomber every hour.
 June 20
The United States Army Air Forces comes into being, taking over the former United States Army Air Corps.
Walt Disney's live-action animated feature The Reluctant Dragon is released.

July
 July 1
 Mammoth Cave National Park is authorized by Congress.
 Commercial television is authorized by the Federal Communications Commission.
 NBC Television begins commercial operation on WNBT, on Channel 1. The world's first legal TV commercial, for Bulova watches, occurs at 2:29 PM over WNBT, before a baseball game between the Brooklyn Dodgers and Philadelphia Phillies. The 10-second spot displays a picture of a clock superimposed on a map of the United States, accompanied by the voice-over "America runs on Bulova time." As a one-off special, the first quiz show called "Uncle Bee" is telecast on WNBT's inaugural broadcast day, followed later the same day by Ralph Edwards hosting the second game show broadcast on U.S. television, Truth or Consequences, as simulcast on radio and TV and sponsored by Ivory Soap. Weekly broadcasts of the show commence in 1956, with Bob Barker.
 CBS Television begins commercial operation on New York station WCBW (modern-day WCBS-TV), on Channel 2.
 July 7 – World War II: American forces take over the defense of Iceland from the British.
 July 23 – Hero thrill show is held in Philadelphia.
 July 26 
World War II: In response to the Japanese occupation of French Indochina, U.S. President Franklin D. Roosevelt orders the seizure of all Japanese assets in the United States.
World War II: General Douglas MacArthur is named commander of all U.S. forces in the Philippines; the Philippines Army is ordered nationalized by President Roosevelt.
 July 30 – World War II: The U.S. gunboat  is attacked by Japanese aircraft while anchored in the Yangtze River at Chungking. Japan apologizes for the incident the following day.
 July – The Lockheed P-38 Lightning fighter aircraft is introduced.

August

 August 1 – U.S. President Franklin D. Roosevelt bans the export of U.S. aviation fuel from the western hemisphere except to Britain and allies.
 August 6 – Six-year-old Elaine Esposito undergoes an appendectomy and lapses into a coma that lasts for a record-breaking 37 years until her death in 1978.
 August 9 – Franklin D. Roosevelt and Winston Churchill meet at Argentia, Newfoundland and Labrador. The Atlantic Charter is created as a result.
 August 12 – By one vote (203–202), the U.S. House of Representatives passes legislation extending the draft period for selectees and the National Guard from 1 year to 30 months.
 August 31 – The Great Gildersleeve debuts on NBC Radio.

September

 September 4 – World War II: The  becomes the first United States Navy ship fired upon by a German submarine in the war, even though the United States is a neutral power. Tension heightens between the nations as a result.
 September 11 – World War II: Charles Lindbergh, at an America First Committee rally in Des Moines, Iowa, accuses "the British, the Jewish, and the Roosevelt administration" of leading the United States toward war. Widespread condemnation of Lindbergh follows.
 September 29 – World War II:  The first Moscow Conference begins; U.S. representative  Averell Harriman and British representative Lord Beaverbrook meet with Soviet foreign minister Molotov to arrange urgent assistance for Russia.

October
 October 6 – The New York Yankees defeat the Brooklyn Dodgers, 4 games to 1, to win their 9th World Series Title.
 October 17 – World War II: The destroyer  is torpedoed and damaged by German submarine U-568 off Iceland, killing 11 sailors (the first American military casualties of the war).
 October 23 – Walt Disney's fourth animated film, Dumbo, is released to recoup the initial financial losses of both Pinocchio and Fantasia the year prior.
 October 30 – World War II: Franklin D. Roosevelt approves US$1 billion in Lend-Lease aid to the Soviet Union.
 October 31 
After 14 years, work ceases on sculpting Mount Rushmore National Memorial.
World War II: The destroyer  is torpedoed and sunk by German submarine U-552 off Iceland, killing more than 100 U.S. Navy sailors.

November
 November 10 – In a speech at the Mansion House, London, Winston Churchill promises, "should the United States become involved in war with Japan, the British declaration will follow within the hour."
 November 14
 World War II – Attack on Pearl Harbor: Japanese diplomat Saburō Kurusu arrives in the United States to assist Ambassador Kichisaburō Nomura in peace negotiations.
 The 5.4  Los Angeles earthquake severely affected the Gardena–Torrance area of California with a maximum Mercalli intensity of VIII (Severe), causing $1.1 million in financial losses, but no injuries or deaths.
 November 17 – World War II – Attack on Pearl Harbor: Joseph Grew, the United States ambassador to Japan, cables to Washington, D.C., a warning that Japan may strike suddenly and unexpectedly at any time.
 November 24 – World War II: The United States grants Lend-Lease to the Free French.
 November 26 
U.S. President Franklin D. Roosevelt signs a bill establishing the 4th Thursday in November as Thanksgiving Day in the United States (this partly reverses a 1939 action by Roosevelt that changed the celebration of Thanksgiving to the third Thursday of November).
The Hull note ultimatum is delivered to Japan by the United States.
 November 27 
A group of young men stop traffic on U.S. Highway 99 south of Yreka, California, handing out fliers proclaiming the establishment of the State of Jefferson.
World War II – Attack on Pearl Harbor: All U.S. military forces in Asia and the Pacific are placed on war alert.

December

 Wonder Woman comic begins publication.
 December 1 – Fiorello La Guardia, Mayor of New York City and Director of the Office of Civilian Defense, signs Administrative Order 9, creating the Civil Air Patrol under the authority of the United States Army Air Forces.
 December 4 – The State of Jefferson is declared in Yreka, California, with John C. Childs as a governor.
 December 6 – World War II: Attack on Pearl Harbor – Franklin D. Roosevelt makes a personal peace appeal to Emperor Hirohito of Japan.
 December 7 (07:48 Hawaiian Time; 12:48 EST; December 8 03:18 Japan Standard Time) – Attack on Pearl Harbor: The Imperial Japanese Navy Air Service stages a military strike on the United States Navy fleet at Pearl Harbor in the Territory of Hawaii, thus drawing the U.S. into World War II.
 December 8
World War II (12:30 EST): Franklin Roosevelt gives his Infamy Speech to a joint session of Congress. Within an hour the United States declaration of war on Japan is signed.
The exhibition American Negro Art: Nineteenth and Twentieth Centuries opens in Edith Halpert's Downtown Gallery in New York City.
 December 11 – World War II:
American forces repel a Japanese landing attempt at Wake Island.
Germany and Italy declare war on the United States. The U.S. responds in kind.
 December 12 – World War II:
Hungary and Romania declare war on the United States.
The U.S. seizes the French transatlantic liner .
 December 19 – The United States Naval Academy in Annapolis, Maryland graduates its "Class of 1942" a semester early so as to induct the graduating students without delay into the U.S. Navy and/or Marine Corps as officers, for immediate stationing in the war. 
 December 20 – Admiral Ernest King is appointed Commander-in-Chief of the U.S. fleet.
 December 23 – World War II: A second Japanese landing attempt on Wake Island is successful and the American garrison surrenders after a full night and morning of fighting.
 December 26 – World War II: Winston Churchill becomes the first British Prime Minister to address a joint session of the U.S. Congress.

Ongoing
 World War II, U.S. involvement (1941–1945)

Undated
 The Centenary College Choir (America's Singing Ambassadors) is formed by Dr. A. C. Voran at Centenary College of Louisiana.

Sport 
April 12 – The Boston Bruins won their third Stanley Cup, and last until 1970, defeating the Detroit Red Wings 4 games to 0. The deciding Game 4 was played at Detroit's Olympia Arena.

Baseball fans across the nation witnessed not one, but two of the most amazing individual efforts and achievements the game has ever known. The two measures recorded during the 1941 campaign both stand to this day and are regarded by practically all, even the most casual of fans, to be unattainable in the game today. 1941 saw the great Joltin' Joe DiMaggio step up to the plate in 56 consecutive baseball games and hit safely to break a record that had withstood the test of time since 1897 when Wee Willie Keeler totaled 45 consecutive games hitting safely over the course of the 1896 and 97 seasons. The Splendid Splinter, Ted Williams, also treated baseball fans to a feat that has also barely been threatened since by having a season for the ages. During the 1941 Teddy Ballgame managed to record a batting average over .400 by finishing the season with an unparalleled .406 batting average. Although his average for the season is not the single season record for baseball, no player has hit .400 or better since.

Births

January

 January 1 – Marshall "Rock" Jones, African-American bass player (Ohio Players) (d. 2016)
 January 4
 Maureen Reagan, American political activist (d. 2001)
 John Bennett Perry, American actor, singer and former model
 January 5
 Harvey Hall, American businessman, politician (d. 2018)
 Chuck McKinley, American tennis player (d. 1986)
 January 7 – Frederick D. Gregory, American pilot and astronaut
 January 9 – Joan Baez, American singer, songwriter and activist
 January 11
 Dave Edwards, American musician (d. 2000)
 Jimmy Velvit, American singer/songwriter
 January 14 – Faye Dunaway, American actress
 January 15 – Captain Beefheart, American singer (d. 2010)
 January 18 – David Ruffin, African-American singer (The Temptations) (d. 1991)
 January 19 – Harry Booth, American baseball and basketball coach (d. 2022)
 January 20 – Clift Tsuji, American politician (d. 2016)
 January 21 – Richie Havens, African-American musician (d. 2013)
 January 23 – Buddy Buie, American songwriter, record producer (d. 2015)
 January 24
 Neil Diamond, American singer, songwriter
 Aaron Neville, African-American singer
 January 30
 Dick Cheney, 46th Vice President of the United States from 2001 to 2009   
 Delbert Mann, American television, film director (d. 2007)
 January 31
 Lynne Abraham, American lawyer, District Attorney of Philadelphia (1991–2010)
 Dick Gephardt, American politician 
 Jessica Walter, American actress

February

 February 1 – Jerry Spinelli, American author
 February 3
 Dory Funk, Jr., American professional wrestler
 Howard Phillips, American politician (d. 2013)
 February 5
 Stephen J. Cannell, American director, producer (d. 2010)
 Henson Cargill, American country music singer (d. 2007)
 David Selby, American actor
 Barrett Strong, American Motown singer-songwriter (d. 2023)
 Cory Wells, American rock singer (Three Dog Night) (d. 2015)
 February 6 
 Stephen Albert, American composer (d. 1992)
 Spencer Silver, American chemist and inventor (d. 2021)
 February 8 
 Nick Nolte, American actor
 Tom Rush, American folk and blues singer
 February 9 – Kermit Gosnell, abortion provider and convicted child murderer
 February 11 – Sonny Landham, American actor (d. 2017)
 February 13 – David Jeremiah, American televangelist
 February 17 – Ron Meyer, American football coach (d. 2017)
 February 19 – David Gross, American physicist, Nobel Prize laureate
 February 25 – Sandy Bull, American folk musician, composer (d. 2001)

March

 March 4 – Richard Benjamin Harrison, American businessman, reality TV star (d. 2018)
 March 5 – Stanley Cowell, American jazz pianist (d. 2020)
 March 9 – Ernesto Miranda, American criminal (d. 1976)
 March 10 – George Smith, biochemist, recipient of the Nobel Prize in Chemistry in 2018
 March 15 – Mike Love, American musician (Beach Boys) 
 March 16 – Chuck Woolery, American game show host
 March 17 – Paul Kantner, American rock guitarist (Jefferson Airplane) (d. 2016)
 March 18 – Wilson Pickett, African-American singer (d. 2006)
 March 20 – Paul Junger Witt, American film & television producer (d. 2018)
 March 23 – Jim Trelease, American educator, author
 March 24 – Michael Masser, songwriter, composer and producer of popular music (d. 2015)
 March 27 – Bunny Sigler, American singer, songwriter and record producer (d. 2017)
 March 28
 Alf Clausen, American composer
 Jeffrey Moussaieff Masson, author and academic
 Jim Turner, American football player
 March 29 – Joseph Hooton Taylor, Jr., American astrophysicist, Nobel Prize laureate
 March 30 – Bob Smith, American politician

April

 April 2 – Dr. Demento (Barret Eugene Hansen), American radio disc jockey, novelty music collector
 April 3
 Jan Berry, American singer (Jan & Dean) (d. 2004)
 Philippé Wynne, American musician (d. 1984)
 April 6 – Phil Austin, American comedian (The Firesign Theater) (d. 2015)
 April 8 – Peggy Lennon, American singer (The Lennon Sisters)
 April 9 – Kay Adams, American country singer
 April 13 – Michael Stuart Brown, American geneticist, recipient of the Nobel Prize in Physiology or Medicine
 April 14 – Pete Rose, American baseball player
 April 20 – Ryan O'Neal, American actor (Love Story)
 April 21 – David L. Boren, American politician
 April 23 – Ray Tomlinson, American computer programmer (d. 2016)
 April 24 – Richard Holbrooke, American diplomat (d. 2010)
 April 26 – John Mitchell, American composer and educator
 April 27
 Pat Choate, American economist, politician
 H. Tristram Engelhardt Jr., American philosopher (d. 2018) 
 Lee Roy Jordan, American football player
 April 28 – K. Barry Sharpless, American chemist, double Nobel Prize laureate

May

 May 8
 Bill Lockyer, American academic and politician, 30th Attorney General of California
 James Mitchum, American actor
 James Traficant, American lawyer and politician (d. 2014)
 May 9 – Howard Komives, American professional basketball player (d. 2009)
 May 10 – Taurean Blacque, American television and stage actor
 May 13 – Ritchie Valens, Mexican American singer-songwriter and guitarist (d. 1959)
 May 16 
 Aldrich Ames, American CIA analyst and KGB agent
 Peter Nicholas, American businessman and philanthropist (d. 2022)
 May 17 – Ben Nelson, American politician
 May 19
 Peter C. Bjarkman, American baseball historian, author (d. 2018)
 Bobby Burgess, American dancer, singer
 Nora Ephron, American novelist and screenwriter (d. 2012)
 May 21 – Bobby Cox, American baseball manager
 May 23 
 General Johnson, American singer-songwriter and producer (d. 2010)
 Martin Puryear, American sculptor
 May 24 – Bob Dylan, American poet, musician and recipient of the Nobel Prize in Literature
 May 27 – Ira Berlin, American historian (d. 2018)
 May 31
 Louis Ignarro, American pharmacologist, recipient of the Nobel Prize in Physiology or Medicine
 William Nordhaus, American economist, recipient of the Nobel Memorial Prize in Economic Sciences

June

 June 2 – Stacy Keach, American actor
 June 5 
 Spalding Gray, American actor, screenwriter (d. 2004)
 Robert Kraft, American businessman
 June 8 – Fuzzy Haskins, American musician 
 June 10 – Mickey Jones, American rock drummer and actor (d. 2018)
 June 12 
 Marv Albert, American sports announcer
 Chick Corea, American jazz pianist (d. 2021)
 June 14 – John Edgar Wideman, African-American novelist, author and professor
 June 15
 Neal Adams, American comic book artist (d. 2022)
 Harry Nilsson, American musician (d. 1994)
 June 16 – Lamont Dozier, American songwriter (d. 2022)
 June 21
 Mitty Collier, American church pastor, gospel singer and former rhythm and blues singer
 Joe Flaherty, American-Canadian actor, comedian (Second City Television)
 Jimmy Rayl, American professional basketball player (d. 2019)
 June 22
 Ed Bradley, African-American journalist (60 Minutes) (d. 2006)
 Howard Kindig, American football player 
 Michael Lerner, American actor
 June 24
 Bill Reardon, American politician, educator
 Charles Whitman, American mass murderer (d. 1966)
 June 25
 Miles Feinstein, American criminal law defense attorney, legal commentator
 Mike Stoker, American firefighter, engineer and captain
 June 26 – Nick Macarchuk, American basketball head coach
 June 27
 Jerry Allen, American football player
 Mike Honda, American politician and educator
 June 28
 Len Boehmer, American Major League Baseball player
 Joseph Goguen, American computer scientist (d. 2006)
 June 29
 John Boccabella, American professional baseball player
 David A. Bramlett, United States Army four-star general
 Larry Stahl, American baseball player

July

 July 2 – Chris Noel, American actress
 July 3 
 Gloria Allred, American lawyer
 Casey Cox, American baseball player
 July 4
 Jay Carty, American basketball player (d. 2017)
 Digger Phelps, American former college basketball coach
 July 5
 Terry Cashman, American singer-songwriter and record producer
 Peggy Miley, American actress, writer
 July 6 
 John DeCamp, American politician (d. 2017)
 Steve McMillan, American politician (d. 2022)
 Randall Robinson, African-American lawyer, author and activist
 Harold Leighton Weller, American conductor
 July 7 – Louis Friedman, American astronautics engineer, space spokesperson
 July 8
 Thunderbolt Patterson, American professional wrestler
 Ken Sanders, American Major League Baseball relief pitcher
 July 9 – Tom Black, American professional basketball player
 July 10 – Robert Pine, American actor
 July 13 – Robert Forster, American actor
 July 14 – Maulana Karenga, African-American author, activist; founder of Kwanzaa
 July 16
 Ken Herock, American college, professional football player
 Lloyd Sisco, American football coach
 July 17 – Marina Oswald Porter, Russian-born widow of JFK assassin Lee Harvey Oswald  
 July 18
 Marcia Jones-Smoke, American sprint canoer
 Lonnie Mack, American singer, guitarist (d. 2016) 
 July 21 – Gary Waslewski, American baseball player 
 July 22 
 George Clinton, African-American musician
 Rich Jackson, American football player
 Susie Berning, American professional golfer
 July 25 – Emmett Till, African American victim of lynching (d. 1955)
 July 26 – Darlene Love, African-American singer, actress
 July 28 – Michael Mukasey, American politician and lawyer, 81st United States Attorney General
 July 29 – Jennifer Dunn, American politician (d. 2007)

August

 August 3 – Martha Stewart, American television personality and media entrepreneur
 August 4 – Ted Strickland, American politician
 August 5 – Gil Garcetti, American politician
 August 6 – Lyle Berman, American poker player
 August 8
 Earl Boen, actor and voice actor
 George Tiller, physician (d. 2009)
 August 9 – Shirlee Busbee, novelist
 August 12 – Deborah Walley, actress (d. 2001)
 August 14
 Lynne Cheney, American author and scholar, Second Lady of the United States as wife of Dick Cheney
 David Crosby, American folk rock guitarist and singer-songwriter (died 2023)
 Connie Smith, born Constance Meador, country singer
 August 20 – Joyce Pensato, American painter (d. 2019)
 August 21 – Jackie DeShannon, American singer-songwriter (What the World Needs Now)
 August 26 – Barbara Ehrenreich, American writer and political activist (d. 2022)

September

 September 2 – John Thompson, American basketball coach (d. 2020)
 September 3 – Dave Herman, American football player (d. 2022)
 September 6 – Danny K. Davis, African-American politician
 September 8 – Bernie Sanders, American politician
 September 9
 Otis Redding, African-American singer, musician (d. 1967)
 Dennis Ritchie, American computer scientist (d. 2011)
 September 10 – Stephen Jay Gould, American paleontologist and evolutionist (d. 2002)
 September 15 – Signe Toly Anderson, American singer (d. 2016)
 September 17 – Bob Matsui, American politician (d. 2005)
 September 18 – Priscilla Mitchell, American country music singer (d. 2014)
 September 19 – Cass Elliot, American singer (The Mamas & the Papas) (d. 1974)
 September 20 – Dale Chihuly, American glass sculptor
 September 21 – R. James Woolsey Jr., American lawyer and diplomat
 September 22 – Jeremiah Wright, pastor
 September 23 – George Jackson, American author (d. 1971)
 September 24
 Guy Hovis, American singer
 Linda McCartney, American activist, musician and photographer (d. 1998)
 Lynne Taetzsch, American painter and writer
 September 27 – Sam Zell, American publisher, investor
 September 28 – Charley Taylor, American football player (d. 2022)

October

 October 3 – Chubby Checker, African-American rhythm and blues singer
 October 4
 Roy Blount, Jr., American writer and comedian
 Elizabeth Eckford, American activist
 Anne Rice, American writer of vampire fiction (d. 2021)
 October 5 – Roy Book Binder, singer-songwriter and guitarist
 October 8 – Jesse Jackson, African-American clergyman and civil rights activist
 October 9 – Trent Lott, politician
 October 10 – Peter Coyote, actor, author, director, screenwriter and narrator of films, theatre, television and audio books
 October 13 – Paul Simon, singer-songwriter
 October 16 – Tim McCarver, baseball player and sportscaster (d. 2023)
 October 17 – Earl Thomas Conley, country music singer (d. 2019)
 October 23 – Mel Winkler, actor (d. 2020)
 October 25 – Anne Tyler, novelist
 October 27 – Dick Trickle, race car driver (d. 2013)
 October 30 – Otis Williams, singer
 October 31 – Sally Kirkland, actress

November

 November 1 – Robert Foxworth, American actor
 November 5 – Art Garfunkel, American singer
 November 6
 Guy Clark, American singer, songwriter (d. 2016)
 Ray Perkins, American football player and coach (d. 2020)
 Doug Sahm, American roots rock musician (d. 1999)
 November 8 – William K. Brewster, American politician and pharmacist (d. 2022)
 November 9 – Tom Fogerty, American guitarist (Creedence Clearwater Revival) (d. 1990)
 November 12 – Carol Gluck, American historian, author, and academic
 November 13
 Joseph L. Galloway, American newspaper columnist, Vietnam War historian (d. 2021)
 David Green, American businessman and philanthropist, founder of Hobby Lobby
 Dack Rambo, American actor (d. 1994)
 Mel Stottlemyre, American professional baseball player and coach (d. 2019)
 November 19 – Dan Haggerty, American actor (d. 2016)
 November 20 – Dr. John, American singer-songwriter and musician (d. 2019)
 November 25
 Ralph Haben, American politician, Speaker of the Florida House of Representatives
 Mike Moore, American baseball executive (d. 2022)
 November 27
 Tom Morga, American stuntman, stunt coordinator, and actor.
 Henry Carr, American Olympic athlete (d. 2015)
 Eddie Rabbitt, American country musician (d. 1998)
 November 29 
 Bill Freehan, American baseball player
 Jody Miller, American country musician (d. 2022)

December

 December 6 – Richard Speck, American mass murderer (d. 1991)
 December 7 – Melba Pattillo Beals, American journalist and activist
 December 8
 Ed Brinkman, American baseball player and coach (d. 2008)
 Bob Brown, American football offensive lineman
 Duke Cunningham, commander and politician
 December 9 – Beau Bridges, American actor
 December 11
 Max Baucus, American politician
 J. Frank Wilson, American rock & roll musician (d. 1991)
 December 12 – Katharine Lee Reid, American art historian and museum curator (d. 2022)
 December 13 – John Davidson, American singer and actor
 December 19 – Maurice White, African-American singer, songwriter, musician and record producer, founder of Earth, Wind & Fire (d. 2016)
 December 21 – Jared Martin, American actor (d. 2017)
 December 23
 Ron Bushy, American rock musician 
 Tim Hardin, American folk musician (d. 1980)
 December 24 – Lex Hixon, American Sufi author, poet, and spiritual teacher (d. 1995)  
 December 27 – Miles Aiken, American basketball player and coach
 December 30 – Mel Renfro, American football player

Full date unknown
 Cynthia Krupat, American graphic designer

Deaths
 January 8 – Jennie Tuttle Hobart, Second Lady of the United States as wife of Garret Hobart (b. 1849)
 January 12 – Mary Onahan Gallery, writer and editor (b. 1866)
 January 20 – Joe Penner, Hungarian-American actor (b. 1904)
 January 20 – John Bissinger, Olympic gymnast (b. 1879)
 February 2 – Harris Laning, admiral (b. 1873)
 February 9 – Aaron S. Watkins, Presidential candidate (Prohibition Party) (born 1863)
 February 20 – Charles Rockwell Lanman, Sanskrit scholar (b. 1850)
 February 27 – William D. Byron, Congressman (b. 1895)
 March 6 – Gutzon Borglum, artist, sculptor, creator of the Mount Rushmore National Memorial (b. 1867)
 March 8 – Sherwood Anderson, fiction writer (b. 1876)
 March 13 – Elizabeth Madox Roberts, novelist and poet (b. 1881)
 April 13 – Annie Jump Cannon, astronomer (b. 1863)
 June 11 – Daniel Carter Beard, American scouting pioneer (b. 1850) 
 June 21 – Elliott Dexter, American actor (b. 1870) 
 June 26 – Andrew Jackson Houston, American politician (b. 1854) 
 June 28 – Richard Carle, American actor (b. 1871)  
 July 10 – Jelly Roll Morton, African American jazz pianist (b. 1890)
 July 12 – Carl Jules Weyl, art director and Reichswehr soldier (born 1890 in Germany)
 July 20 – Lew Fields, American vaudeville performer (b. 1867) 
 July 25 – Allan Forrest, American actor (b. 1885)  
 July 26 – Benjamin Lee Whorf, linguist (b. 1897)
 July 30 – Mickey Welch, American baseball player, MLB Hall of Famer (b. 1859) 
 September 13 – Elias Disney, farmer, father of Walt Disney (born 1859)
 October 5 – Louis Brandeis, U.S. Supreme Court Justice (b. 1856)
 October 8 – Gus Kahn, lyricist (born 1886 in Germany)
 October 23 – Anton Marius Andersen, Lutheran minister (b. 1847)
 November 10 – Grace Ingalls, youngest sister of author Laura Ingalls Wilder (b. 1877)
 November 12 – Abe Reles, mobster (b. 1907)
 December 7 – Attack on Pearl Harbor: U.S. Navy personnel
 Mervyn S. Bennion, captain (b. 1887)
 Herbert C. Jones, officer (b. 1918)
 Isaac C. Kidd, admiral (b. 1884)
 Thomas James Reeves, radioman (b. 1895)
 Franklin Van Valkenburgh, captain (b. 1888)
 December 25 – Blanche Bates, stage actress (b. 1873)

See also
 List of American films of 1941
 Timeline of United States history (1930–1949)
 Timeline of World War II

References

External links
 

 
1940s in the United States
United States
United States
Years of the 20th century in the United States